Carlo Tamberlani (11 March 1899 – 5 August 1980) was an Italian film actor. He appeared in 127 films between 1931 and 1976. He was born in Salice Salentino, Italy and died in Subiaco, Italy. His brother Nando Tamberlani was also an actor.

Life and career 
Born in Salice Salentino, Tamberlani was born in a family of actors and made his debut in his father's stage company. After working with some of the major companies of the time he founded his own company with the actress Bella Starace Sainati and later served as vice-director of the Ermete Zacconi's stage company. Between 1936 and 1939 he worked as acting teacher at the Accademia di Arte Drammatica.

Selected filmography

 The Devil's Lantern (1931)
 Loyalty of Love (1934) - Luigi Parravicini
 Red Passport (1935) - L'ufficiale comandante le truppe
 Scipio Africanus: The Defeat of Hannibal (1937) - Ambasciatore Romano
 Condottieri (1937) - Il duca d'Urbino
 The Count of Brechard (1938) - Carlo, Visconte di Bréchard
 Giuseppe Verdi (1938) - Demalde
 Lotte nell'ombra (1938)
 La Damigella di Bard (1938) - Ferdinandi di Bard
 Guest for One Night (1939) - Jean Berry
 The Fornaretto of Venice (1939) - Mocenigo
 Tredici uomini e un cannone (1939) - La sentinella
 Le educande di Saint-Cyr (1939) - Gioacchino Murat
 L'albergo degli assenti (1939) - Marisol, l'ubriaco
 Il ladro sono io (1940) - Giorgio
 Siege of the Alcázar (1940) - Il capitano Vincenzo Alba
 Giuliano de' Medici (1941) - Lorenzo de' Medici
 Piccolo mondo antico (1941) - Don Costa
 Pia de' Tolomei (1941) - Nello della Pietra
 The Mask of Cesare Borgia (1941) - Jacopo Bentivoglio
 Il cavaliere senza nome (1941) - Gomez della Nevada
 Turbine (1941) - Don Antonio
 A Woman Has Fallen (1941) - Il medico del pronto soccorso
 La sonnambula (1941) - Agostino
 Souls in Turmoil (1942) - Il professore Alberto Ferrari
 Document Z-3 (1942)
 Perdizione (1942) - Il medico
 Bengasi (1942) - Giovanni Galassi
 Le vie del cuore (1942) - Filippo Navarria, suo fratello
 Notte di fiamme (1942)
 Measure for Measure (1943) - Il reggente Angelo
 Redemption (1943) - Giuseppe Madidini
 Febbre (1943) - Saverio Grantèr
 Noche fantástica (1943) - Defensor de Pablo (uncredited)
 L'abito nero da sposa (1945) - Andrea Strozzi
 The Ten Commandments (1945)
 La sua strada (1946)
 L'apocalisse (1947)
 Bullet for Stefano (1947) - Marshal Borghi
 La monaca di Monza (1947)
 Buried Alive (1949) - Conte Capecci
 The Walls of Malapaga (1949) - Le commissaire / Il commissario
 Adamo ed Eva (1949) - Il messagero
 Sicilian Uprising (1949) - Abate Di Santo Spirito
 I peggiori anni della nostra vita (1949)
 Il bacio di una morta (1949) - Il barone Riccardi
 Margaret of Cortona (1950) - Vescovo
 Santo disonore (1950) - Conte Rinaldi
 Cavalcade of Heroes (1950) - Pisacane
 Due sorelle amano (1950) - Sisters' father
 Il richiamo nella tempesta (1950)
 Under the Skies of the Asturias (1951) - Fray Atanasio
 Doubt (1951) - Comisario
 Facing the Sea (1951) - Alberto
 Catalina de Inglaterra (1951)
 The Evil Forest (1951) - Gurnemancio, el apóstol
 A Thief in Paradise (1952) - San Giuseppe
 La figlia del diavolo (1952) - Conte Vincenzo Terzi
 Perseguidos (1952)
 Noi peccatori (1953) - L'oculista (uncredited)
 Nero and the Burning of Rome (1953) - Tigellino
 Captain Phantom (1953)
 Frine, Courtesan of Orient (1953) - Assirione
 Soli per le strade (1953)
 Pietà per chi cade (1954) - The judge
 Loving You Is My Sin (1954) - Monti - Elena's father
 New Moon (1955) - Avvocato difensore
 Suonno d'ammore (1955) - Michele Loiacono
 Adriana Lecouvreur (1955)
 Amici per la pelle (1955) - Il padre di Franco
 Folgore Division (1955) - Santini's Friend
 Una sera di maggio (1955) - Giorgio Biamonti
 Scapricciatiello (1955) - Avvocato Ronca - The notary public
 Il conte Aquila (1955)
 Altair (1956)
 Incatenata dal destino (1956)
 Alone in the Streets (1956) - Police Commissioner
 I giorni più belli (1956) - Il sacerdote
 Nero's Weekend (1956) - Senator
 Mermaid of Naples (1956) - Maruzzella's Father
 Guaglione (1956) - Marisa 's Father
 Amaramente (1956) - Commissario Barni
 Occhi senza luce (1956)
 Io, Caterina (1957)
 Saranno uomini (1957)
 Il ricatto di un padre (1957) - Mario Guarnieri
 The Knight of the Black Sword (1957) - Antonio
 Orizzonte infuocato (1957) - Padre di Gabriele
 Il Conte di Matera (1958) - L'architetto
 Adorabili e bugiarde (1958) - Rossi the Chief Editor
 Slave Women of Corinth (1958) - Matteo
 Il padrone delle ferriere (1959)
 Cavalier in Devil's Castle (1959) - Conte Oliviero
 Le fric (1959) - Morassi
 The Last Days of Pompeii (1959) - Olinto, Christian Leader
 Attack of the Moors (1959) - Duke of Chateau Roux
 Son of Samson (1960) - Pharaoh Armiteo I
 Minotaur, the Wild Beast of Crete (1960) - Minosse - King of Crete
 Constantine and the Cross (1961) - Diocletian
 Conqueror of Maracaibo (1961) - Governor
 The Colossus of Rhodes (1961) - Xenon
 Vanina Vanini (1962)
 The Giant of Metropolis (1961)
 The Trojan Horse (1961) - Priam
 Samson (1961) - Botan
 The Fury Of Hercules (1962) - Eridione
 The Hot Port of Hong Kong (1962) - Dr. Ellington
 Zorro in the Court of Spain (1962) - Marchese Pedro Di Villa Verde
 Caesar the Conqueror (1962) - Pompey
 79 A.D. (1962) - Furius
 The Old Testament (1962) - Mattatia
 The Black Panther of Ratana (1963) - Pater Antonio
 Duel at the Rio Grande (1963) - Alcalde
 Hercules Against Rome (1964) - Imperatore Gordiano
 Maciste in King Solomon's Mines (1964) - Zelea
 The Lion of Thebes (1964) - Menophis
 Seven Slaves Against the World (1964) - Lucius Terentius
 Hercules and the Treasure of the Incas (1964) - Burt Nixon
 Samson and His Mighty Challenge (1964)
 Triumph of the Ten Gladiators (1964) - Publio Rufo
 3 Avengers (1964) - King Igos
 13 Days to Die (1965) - Barrington
 Legacy of the Incas (1965) - Anciano
 Seven Rebel Gladiators (1965) - King Krontal
 I predoni del Sahara (1965) - Lord Flatters
 Kommissar X – In den Klauen des goldenen Drachen (1965) - Jonathan Taylor
 The Drums of Tabu (1966) - Inspector Duras
 The Three Fantastic Supermen (1967) - Professor Schwarz
 Death Trip (1967) - Konsul Snyder
 If You Meet Sartana Pray for Your Death (1968) - Reverend Logan
 La scoperta (1969)
 Sabata (1969) - Nichols
 Sotto a chi tocca! (1972) - Prior of the Monastery
 Counselor at Crime (1973) - Don Michele Villabate
 The Divine Nymph (1975) - Majordomo Pasqualino
 Illustrious Corpses (1976) - Archbishop

References

External links

1899 births
1980 deaths
People from the Province of Lecce
Italian male film actors
20th-century Italian male actors
Academic staff of the Accademia Nazionale di Arte Drammatica Silvio D'Amico
Italian male stage actors